Randolph J. Staudenraus is a United States Air Force major general who has served as the Director of Strategic Plans and Policy, and International Affairs of the National Guard Bureau from September 2020. Previously, he was the Senior Defense Official and Defense Attaché to Kuwait from May 2020 to September 2020.

References

Living people
Place of birth missing (living people)
Recipients of the Defense Superior Service Medal
Recipients of the Distinguished Flying Cross (United States)
Recipients of the Legion of Merit
United States Air Force generals
United States Air Force personnel of the Gulf War
Year of birth missing (living people)